The 1902–03 City Cup was the ninth edition of the City Cup, a cup competition in Irish football.

The tournament was won by Linfield for the seventh time and fourth consecutive year. They defeated Belfast Celtic 1–0 in a test match after the teams finished level in the table.

Group standings

Test match

References

1902–03 in Irish association football